Nicanthes rhodoclea is a moth of the family Agonoxenidae and the only species in the genus Nicanthes. It is found in Guyana and Puerto Rico.

References

Moths described in 1928
Agonoxeninae
Moths of the Caribbean
Moths of South America